This is a list of diseases of grapes (Vitis spp.).

Bacterial diseases

Fungal diseases

Miscellaneous diseases and disorders

Nematodes, parasitic

Phytoplasma, virus and viruslike diseases

See also
Ampeloglypter ater
Ampeloglypter sesostris
Ampelomyia viticola
Eupoecilia ambiguella
Great French Wine Blight
Japanese beetle
List of Lepidoptera that feed on grapevines
Maconellicoccus hirsutus
Otiorhynchus cribricollis
Paralobesia viteana
Pseudococcus maritimus
Pseudococcus viburni
Zenophassus

References

External links
 Diseases of Grapevines, information from Cooperative Extension
 Common Names of Diseases, The American Phytopathological Society
 SAFECROP - Proceedings of the 5th International Workshop on Grapevine Downy and Powdery Mildew
 virus diseases of the grapevine

Grape